Yuvarani (born 30 November 1974) is an Indian actress. She has appeared in several Tamil films in the female lead role while she has also featured in television serials.

She played Rajinikanth's sister in Baashha, Prabhavathy in the Tamil Serial Chithi,  and Sundari in Thendral.

Controversy
In April 2010, Yuvarani won RM70,000 in damages in a defamation suit against two distributors and the publisher of popular monthly magazine Indian Movie News (IMN). She filed the civil suit in 2003 against Percetakan Kum, distributor of IMN in Peninsular Malaysia Mentakab Agency (M) Sdn Bhd, publisher Indian Movie News Publications (M) Sdn Bhd and IMN distributor in Singapore, Indian Movie News Publications P/L. The actress claimed she had been defamed by material printed and published in the Tamil language by the defendants in two issues of IMN, namely the April 1998 and August 1998 issues. She alleged that the materials published were false and done with malicious intent.

Filmography

Television

Awards and nominations
2017 : Asianet television awards 2017 - Best Character Actress (Nominations) - Bharya
2018 : Asianet television awards 2018 - Best Character Actress (Nominations) - Bharya

References

Living people
Actresses in Tamil cinema
Indian film actresses
1974 births
Actresses in Malayalam television
Actresses in Malayalam cinema
Actresses in Telugu cinema
Actresses in Tamil television